Okha railway station is a railway station in Okha, Gujarat. It belongs to Rajkot Division of Western Railway in India.

Geography
The Okha railway station is one of the western broad-gauge railway stations in India. It serves the port of Okha. There are trains to destinations in India like Mumbai, Somnath, Howrah, Nathdwara, Gorakhpur, Puri, Guwahati, Rameswaram, Kochi, Tuticorin, Varanasi, Dehradun  and Jaipur .

History
Jamnagar–Okha metre-gauge line was opened for traffic in the year 1922 by Jamnagar & Dwarka Railway. Later Jamnagar & Dwaraka Railway was merged into Saurashtra Railway in April 1948. Later it was undertaken by Western Railway. Gauge Conversion of Hapa–Okha section was later completed in 1984 by Indian Railways.

Major trains

Following Express/Superfast trains originate from Okha railway station:

 15635/15636 Dwarka Express
 15045/15046 Gorakhpur–Okha Express
 19567/19568 Okha–Tuticorin Vivek Express
 16337/16338 Ernakulam–Okha Express
 19251/19252 Somnath–Okha Express
 22969/22970 Okha–Varanasi Superfast Express
 22905/22906 Okha–Shalimar Superfast Express
 16733/16734 Rameswaram–Okha Express
 19575/19576 Okha–Nathdwara Express
 20819/20820 Puri–Okha Dwarka Express
 19565/19566 Uttaranchal Express
 19573/19574 Okha–Jaipur Weekly Express
 22945/22946 Saurashtra Mail

References

Railway stations in Devbhoomi Dwarka district
Rajkot railway division
Railway stations opened in 1922